Vladimir Mikhailovich Genin (born 31 March 1958 in Moscow, Soviet Union) is a Russian-German composer, pianist and piano teacher. Since 1997 he lives in Munich.

Life, career, compositions 
Vladimir Genin is the son of the writer and musician Mikhail Genin and Elena Spinel. His grandfather Jossif (Joseph) Spinel was a painter and stage designer.

After graduation 1977 from the Tchaikovsky Academic Music College at the Moscow State Conservatory for one year he studied piano at the State Pedagogical University with Alisa Kezheradze, then composition with Prof. Roman Ledenev and piano with Prof. Ilya Kljachko at the Moscow State Tchaikovsky Conservatory. His compositional development was influenced also by his long friendship with Shostakovich's pupilGeorgy Sviridov.

Works by V. Genin have been published by Sikorski Music Publishers, Musikverlag Ries&Erler Berlin and Challenge Records International and have been performed in Europe, Russia, South Korea and in the US, among others with the with Symphony Orchestra of the Moscow Opera Theatre "New Opera" under Yevgeny Kolobov, Symphony Orchestra of the Mariinsky Opera Theatre St. Petersburg under Valery Gergiev, Rotterdams Philharmonic Orchestra under Valery Gergiev, The Menuhin Academy Soloists Switzerland, Orchestra del Teatro Comunale di Bologna and Graz Philharmonic Orchestra under Oksana Lyniv, INSO Lemberg unter V. Protasov.

They were performed at the International Review of Composers in Belgrade, the International Festival Moscow Autumn, the International Gori Choral Festival Georgia, the 'Musikfest der Münchner Gesellschaft für Neue Musik, The Hohenloher Kultursommer et al.

The mystery play Plaint of Andrei Bogolubski, Great Prince of Vladimir was performed during the celebration of the Millennium of Christianity in Russia and on a concert tour in the USA and has since seen over 70 performances. Over 20,000 copies of this work have been sold on records and CDs.

Performances of his orchestrations of Modest Mussorgsky's vocal cycles Songs and Dances of Death and Without Sun commissioned by baritone Dmitri Hvorostovsky took place under the baton of Valery Gergiev in St. Petersburg (Kirov-Mariinsky Theatre Symphony Orchestra), Rotterdam and Brussels (Rotterdam Philharmonic Orchestra).

The feature film The Cosmonaut's Letter (D, 2001) with Genin's original music was presented in cinemas and broadcast by Premiere TV. The Suite from the Film Music was performed by Camerata Nova in the Carl Orff Hall of the Munich Philharmonic under the baton of Vladimir Genin and at the Night of Film Music by the Münchner Rundfunkorchester under Frank Zacher in the Great Concert Hall of the Münchner Musikhochschule.

In 2001, commissioned by the music library Sonoton (Creative Sound Solutions, Munich), he composed six pieces for chamber ensemble together with Roman Raithel, which were released on the CD "Abstract Images" and have since been broadcast as background music by television stations in Europe, Australia, Japan and the USA.

The piano cycle Seven Melodies for the Dial, composed for the pianist Olga Domnina, was released in 2012 by Challenge Records International on a CD, which received positive reviews. A glance at the press review reveals the success of performances of this cycle in Concertgebouw Amsterdam, in the International House of Music Moscow and at Moscow's Stanislavsky Music Theatre.

The CD of the great vocal cycle Les Fleurs du Mal, inspired by Charles Baudelaire, was named CD of the Month in January 2015 by the portal MusicWeb International.

A multimedia project by Vladimir Genin together with the Nodelman Quartet Threnody for the Victims in Ukraine to commemorate the dead of the protests in Kiev in February 2014 (Euromaidan) has generated a lot of attention provided   in Germany.

V. Genin also occasionally orchestrates film scores for important German film composers, such as for the ZDF two-parter "Die Pilgerin" (2014), for the feature films "Insoupçonnable" (Switzerland/France 2010), "Lippels Traum" (D 2009).

Since 2015 V. Genin has been working closely with the Ukrainian star violinist Valeriy Sokolov. Sonata for violin and piano (2015) and chamber concerto Pietà (2017) were commissioned by him.

In May 2022, Genin won the "Best Musical Short Film" award for "Dreams" at the International Music Video Awards.

The New Grove Dictionary of Music and Musicians dedicated an article to the work of Vladimir Genin.

As the initiator and artistic director of the project The Musicians' Guild of the Future, he teaches piano, chamber music, composition, orchestration and prepares young artists for competitions and for studies at the conservatory. Among his students are prize winners of national and international competitions in Germany, France and Switzerland. He has been realizing his pedagogical principles since 2002 as Head of the Music Department with a team of 20 and 260 students at the Music school Hallbergmoos  and since 2012 a regular professor at the Austrian Master Classes. He is also artistic director of the concert series  erstKlassiK  which he launched in 2008.

Works

Musical works (selection) 
 HANDCUFFS-IMPRO In solidarity with those fearless people who fight for freedom and their rights 2020
 PUNTO CORONATA QUASI UNA PASSACAGLIA for orchestra / for ensemble (various instrumentations) 2020
 DAS KNABENHERZ VON PYRMONT Triller-Opera, Chamber opera in 5 scenes 2019
 PIETÀ Chamber Concerto for Violin and String Orchestra dedicated to Valery Sokolov 2016
 ALKESIS Mini-Monoopera 2015
 ORPHEUS. EURYDIKE. HERMES Mini-Monoopera 2017
 CONCERTO for accordion and string orchestra 2018
 EPITAPHIUM for orchestra 2018
 MALAFEMMINA, OR AWFUL BEAUTY Tragedia Buffa, Opera in two acts 2013
 GeBeeth for orchestra Homage to L.v.Beethoven on his 250th Anniversary 2019
 Russian Roulette A Game of Hazard for Symphony Orchestra 2014
 Liturgical Concerto for piano and symphony orchestra 2011
 Diptych for piano and symphony orchestra 2010
 Sinfonietta for strings 2010
 Suite from the film music The Cosmonaut's Letter for orchestra 2002
 Threnody for the Victims in Ukraine for strings 2015
 Bach is all around for strings 2009
 Deux pantomimes plastiques avec Intermede Triptych for violin and piano 2003
 Sonata for violin and piano dedicated to Valery Sokolov 2014
 Poeme for viola and piano 1986
 Fantasy after Temen from the opera "Boris Godunov" by Modest Mussorgski for piano quartet 1998
 Polovtsian Dances from the opera "Prince Igor" by Alexander Borodin for piano quartet 1998
 Seven Melodies for the Dial, Piano cycle 2011
 The Plaint of Andrei Bogolubski, Great Prince of Vladimir Mistery play for soloists and choir 1987
 Confession of St. Augustine Cantata for speaker, soloists and choir 1990
 Les Fleurs du Mal Twelve Songs and Dances for Soprano, Violin, Viola, Cello & Piano inspired by Charles-Pierre Baudelaire 2013
 Transport of Elements / Re-poetry Vocal cycle on the texts of B. Pasternak, M. Tsvetaeva and R. M. Rilke (in English, German and Russian) 2010
 Last Moments Seven Songs for Soprano, Cello and Piano on the Texts of Xenia Evangelista (in German) 2006

Musicological and literary works 
 Thoughts on the Piano Bench Article Series // Pianist - Munich: Piranha Media, 2009 No.1-4.
 Отец; Голый остров Essais // Almanach Dominante - Munich: Verlag Otto Sagner, 2006, 2008, ISBN 978-3-86688-062-7, 
 Небо как колокол // "Музыкальный мир Георгия Свиридова" - М.: Советский композитор, 1990 - C. 165–173, ISBN 5-85285-048-9.
 Владимирское чудо // М.: Советская музыка, 1989. No. 10.

Discography

Exclusive records 
 The Plaint of Andrei Bogolubski, Great Prince of Vladimir for soloists and choir
 Confession of St. Augustine for speaker, soloists and choir
 in C est 4/4: four chamber compositions for four interpreters
 Seven Melodies for the Dial, Piano cycle
 Les Fleurs du Mal: Twelve Songs and Dances for Soprano, Violin, Viola, Cello & Piano inspired by Charles-Pierre Baudelaire

Other CDs and DVD 
 Original music for the film The Cosmonaut's Letter // DVD The Cosmonaut's Letter (Euro Video)
 Six pieces for chamber ensemble (together with Roman Raithel) // CD Abstrakt Images (Sonoton)
 Arrangement for 12 saxophones of the suite by Georgi Sviridov Snowstorm // CD Saxophone Cinema (MDG)

Literature 
 The New Grove Dictionary of Music and Musicians. 2nd edition. Vol. 9, ISBN 0-333-60800-3, p. 652.
 Karsten Dürer: Hearing impression. In: Pianonews. No.6, Staccato Verlag, 2012, p. 96.
 История отечественной музыки второй половины XX века. Композитор, Saint Petersburg 2010, ISBN 978-5-7379-0277-3, pp. 482–510.
 М. Аркадьев: Размышления о молодом композиторе. In: Советская музыка. No. 12, Moscow 1989, .
 Д. И. Тахватулина: В. Генин. "Плач по Андрею Боголюбскому, Великому Князю Владимирскому". In: Свиридовские чтения: "Родная земля": образ идея русской культуры// Сборник научных статей по материалам VIII Всероссийской студенческой научно-практической конференции. Изд-во ИП Чемодуров, Kursk 2012, pp. 233–248.
 Д. И. Тахватулина: Действо "Три Спаса" В. Генина: опыт жанрового анализа In: Актуальные проблемы культуры, искусства и художественного образования: сборник научных трудов ОГИИ. Вып. 14. Изд-во ГБОУ ВПО "ОГИИ им. Л. и М. Ростроповичей". Оренбург 2013, pp. 142–147.
 Д. И. Тахватулина: Отражение славянских духовных традиций в современной музыке (на примере действа "Три Спаса" В. Генина). In: Свиридовские чтения: "ХХ век: изломы русской истории искусство" // Сборник научных статей по материалам Х Всероссийской студенческой научно-практической конференции. Изд-во ООО "РАСТР. Курск 2014, pp. 242-248.
 Д. И. Тахватулина: В. Генин. Действо "Плач по Андрею Боголюбскому, великому князю владимирскому": особенности жанровой драматурги. In: Художественное произведение в современной культуре: творчество - исполнительство - гуманитарное знание: сб. материалов и науч. ст. III международной заочн. науч.-практ. конф. ЮУрГИИ им. П.И. Чайковского. Челябинск 2015, pp. 87–97.

External links 
 Official website of Vladimir Genin
 Vladimir Genin in the German National Library
 Video channel on Youtube
 Official site of the concert series erstKlassiK
 IMDb

References 

1958 births
Living people
20th-century classical composers
21st-century classical composers
Postmodern composers
Russian classical pianists
Male film score composers
Russian opera composers
Moscow Conservatory alumni
20th-century Russian people
20th-century German people
Russian people of German-Jewish descent
Soviet people of German-Jewish descent
Academic staff of Moscow Conservatory
String quartet composers
Russian music educators
German music educators